Coiled-coil domain-containing protein 3 is a protein that in humans is encoded by the CCDC3 gene.

References

External links

Further reading